Kohlbach may refer to:

Geography
Kohlbach (Ammer), a river in Bavaria, Germany
Kohlbach (Gersprenz), a river in Hesse, Germany

Surname
Veronika Kohlbach (1906–1996), an Austrian Olympic track and field athlete